Zhou Libo (August 9, 1908 – September 25, 1979) was a Chinese novelist and translator.

Biography
Zhou was born Zhou Shaoyi in Yiyang, Hunan on 9 August 1908. He began to use the pseudonym Libo, of which sound is the resemblance of English word "liberty", in the 1930. Zhou taught himself English, then he translated some  English versions of Soviet novels. He was imprisoned for supporting a workers' strike in 1932, on his release he joined the League of the Left-Wing Writers in 1934 and the Communist Party of China in 1935. He served as a war reporter during 1937–38, and interpreter to Agnes Smedley meantime. Then he went to Yan'an and worked at Lu Xun Art Institute in 1939.

Zhou was bestowed the third class Stalin Prize in 1951 for his work The Hurricane. He had been targeted during the Cultural Revolution.

Zhou was elected as the deputy of the 1st, 2nd, and 3rd National People's Congresses.

Works
 暴风骤雨 (Baofeng zhouyu) 1948, translated asThe Hurricane (Translated by Hsu Meng-Hsiung. Illustrations by Ku Yuan.)  Peking: Foreign Languages Press, 1955. 
 山乡巨变 (Shanxiang jubian), 1958. translated as Great Changes in a Mountain Village (Peking: Foreign Languages Press, 1961).

References

External links
Biography of Zhou Libo

1908 births
1979 deaths
Short story writers from Hunan
Politicians from Yiyang
People's Republic of China politicians from Hunan
People's Republic of China translators
Republic of China translators
Republic of China novelists
20th-century Chinese translators
20th-century novelists
Chinese male novelists
Chinese male short story writers
20th-century Chinese short story writers
20th-century Chinese male writers
People's Republic of China short story writers
People's Republic of China novelists